Qui-nai-elt Village is a census-designated place (CDP) in Grays Harbor County, Washington, United States. The population was 54 at the 2010 census.

It is bordered to the south by the community of Moclips. The Moclips Highway runs past the village, leading southwest to Moclips and northeast  to U.S. Route 101 near Neilton.

References

Census-designated places in Grays Harbor County, Washington
Census-designated places in Washington (state)
Quinault settlements